Belgium competed at the 1980 Summer Paralympics in Arnhem, Netherlands. 67 competitors from Belgium won 42 medals including 13 gold, 12 silver and 17 bronze and finished 13th in the medal table.

See also 
 Belgium at the Paralympics
 Belgium at the 1980 Summer Olympics

References 

1980
1980 in Belgian sport
Nations at the 1980 Summer Paralympics